Keith Kelly (born 5 March 1983) is a Jamaican professional footballer who plays as a midfielder for Antiguan club Greenbay Hoppers. Between 2000 and 2005 he made nine appearances for the Jamaica national team.

Club career
A midfielder, Kelly was once regarded as one of the brightest Jamaican talents. He played at the 1999 FIFA U-17 World Championship and caught the eye of French giants Paris St Germain. He also played in the 2001 FIFA World Youth Championship. However, he never made the grade at PSG and was loaned out to Belgian side Mons before returning to Jamaica in 2003. After a several month battle over his contract rights, Kelly finally signed a contract to play for Arnett Gardens.  His time at Arnett Gardens was marked by poor fitness and motivation but he was able to earn a few national team caps during his time.  In 2005, it was rumored that Kelly would return to Harbour View as a replacement for Jermaine Hue, however it did not materialize. He then picked up a severe injury while playing for Trinidadian outfit CL Financial San Juan Jabloteh in November 2005 and after almost two years in the wilderness with a broken foot, Kelly returned to Jamaican football with Harbour View in summer 2007. In January 2011, Kelly moved to Sporting Central Academy in Clarendon. Kelly returned to Harbour View ahead of the 2013–14 season.

International career
Kelly led Jamaica to appearances in the 1999 U-17 World Cup in New Zealand and the 2001 U-20 World Cup in Argentina. He made his senior debut for Jamaica in a November 2001 World Cup qualifying match against Costa Rica. He has collected ten more caps since, his last international match being a February 2005 CONCACAF Gold Cup qualifying game against Barbados.

Honours
Jamaica
Caribbean Cup: 2005

Harbour View
 Digicel Premier League: 2010

References

External links
 

Living people
1983 births
Jamaican footballers
Association football midfielders
Paris Saint-Germain F.C. players
R.A.E.C. Mons players
Arnett Gardens F.C. players
San Juan Jabloteh F.C. players
Harbour View F.C. players
Sporting Central Academy players
Hoppers F.C. players
Championnat National 2 players
Belgian Pro League players
National Premier League players
TT Pro League players
Antigua and Barbuda Premier Division players
Jamaica youth international footballers
Jamaica under-20 international footballers
Jamaica international footballers
Jamaican expatriate footballers
Expatriate footballers in France
Jamaican expatriate sportspeople in France
Expatriate footballers in Belgium
Jamaican expatriate sportspeople in Belgium
Expatriate footballers in Trinidad and Tobago
Jamaican expatriate sportspeople in Trinidad and Tobago
Expatriate footballers in Antigua and Barbuda
Jamaican expatriate sportspeople in Antigua and Barbuda